John, Johnny, or Johnie Watson may refer to:

Politics 
John Watson (16th-century MP) (fl. 1547–1554), Member of Parliament for Morpeth, Newcastle upon Tyne and Berwick-upon-Tweed
Sir John Watson (advocate) (John Charles Watson, 1883–1944), Scottish advocate and sheriff, Solicitor General for Scotland 1929–31
John William Clark Watson (1808–1890), Confederate politician and judge
Chris Watson (John Christian Watson, 1867–1941), Australia's third prime minister
Sir John Bertrand Watson (1878–1948), British Member of Parliament for Stockton-on-Tees, 1917–1923
John S. Watson (New Jersey politician) (1924–1996), African-American Democratic Party politician in New Jersey
John Watson (Australian politician) (born 1937), former Australian senator
John Watson (Skipton MP) (born 1943), British Member of Parliament for Skipton, 1979–1989
John Watson (New Zealand politician) (fl. 2010–present), Auckland Councillor (2015–present)
John Watson (Queensland politician) (1833–?), member of the Queensland Legislative Assembly
John A. Watson, member of the California State Assembly
John Watson (Virginia politician) (died 1870), African-American politician in Virginia
John H. Watson (Vermont judge) (1851–1929), Vermont attorney and judge
John Hampton Watson (1804–1883), American judge
John W. Watson, hardware businessman, state legislator, and mayor of Kissimmee and then Miami

Military
Sir John Watson (Indian Army officer) (1829–1919), English recipient of the Victoria Cross in 1857
John C. Watson (1842–1923), admiral of the United States Navy
John Watson Tadwell Watson, British Army general

Music 
Daddy Stovepipe (1867–1963), real name Johnny Watson, African-American blues singer
Johnny "Guitar" Watson (1935–1996), American blues guitarist
John M. Watson Sr. (1937–2006), American actor and musician
John L. Watson (singer) (1941–2014), American singer who fronted English rock band The Web

Art
John Watson (American painter) (1685–1768), American portrait artist
John Watson, later Sir John Watson Gordon (1788–1864), Scottish painter
John Watson (English artist) (born 1971), English artist and comicbook artist
John Dawson Watson (1832–1892), British painter, watercolorist, and illustrator

Sports
John Watson (American football) (born 1949), former NFL offensive lineman
John Watson (bowls) (born 1945), former Scottish lawn and indoor bowler
John Watson (boxer) (born 1983), British lightweight boxer
John Watson (cricketer, born 1828) (1828–1920), Australian cricketer who made one appearance for Tasmania
John Watson (Somerset cricketer) (1910–1980), English cricketer who made 19 appearances for Somerset
John Watson (curler) (c. 1914–1974), Canadian curler
John Watson (cyclist) (born 1947), British Olympic cyclist
John Watson (equestrian) (born 1952), Irish Olympic equestrian
John Watson (footballer, born 1877) (1877–?), Scottish football player (Everton)
John Watson (footballer, born 1942), football player (Chester City)
John Watson (footballer, born 1959), football player (Fulham)
John Watson (golfer), American golfer
Sir John Watson (polo), British polo player
John Watson (racing driver) (born 1946), British Formula One driver
John Fox Watson (1917–1976), believed to be the only Scottish football player in Real Madrid's history
Johnny Watson (baseball) (1908–1965), American baseball player
Johnie Watson (1896–1958), American baseball player

Fiction
Dr. Watson, fictional associate and biographer of detective Sherlock Holmes in Arthur Conan Doyle's stories
John Watson, known as Wonko the Sane, character from the novel So Long, and Thanks For All the Fish by Douglas Adams

Other
John Watson (Master of Christ's College, Cambridge) (died 1537), priest, academic, and Vice-Chancellor of Cambridge University
John Watson (bishop) (1520–c.1584), Bishop of Winchester
John Watson (officer of arms), English 17th century Bluemantle Pursuivant
John Watson (antiquary) (1725–1783), English clergyman and antiquary
John Boles Watson (c.1748–1813), English theatre builder
John Watson (priest) (1767–1839), English clergyman
John Watson (Dean of Ferns), Irish Anglican priest
John Watson (college president) (1771–1802), first president of Jefferson College, Pennsylvania
John Fanning Watson (1779–1860), American antiquarian
John Kippen Watson (1816–1891), improver of Edinburgh's gas lighting
John Selby Watson (1804–1884), British classical translator and murderer
John Forbes Watson (1827–1892), Scottish physician and writer on India
John Watson (philosopher) (1847–1939), Canadian philosopher and academic
John Watson (1850–1907), Scottish theologian and author who wrote under the pseudonym Ian Maclaren
John Duncan Watson (1860–1946), British civil engineer
John B. Watson (1878–1958), American psychologist; pioneer of behaviorism
John Watson (1914–2007), known as Adam Watson, British international relations theorist and researcher, and ambassador
John L. Watson (born 1951), American chess player and author
John S. Watson (Chevron CEO) (born 1956), American businessman and former CEO of Chevron Corporation
John Watson (activist) (died 2001), American black activist and editor
John Watson (film producer), English film producer
John Boyd Watson (1828–1889), Australian mining magnate and investor
John Michael Watson, English botanist
John Steven Watson (1916–1986), English historian and principal of the University of St Andrews
Jack Watson (cattle station manager) (John Watson, 1852–1896), cattle station manager in Australia

See also
Jack Watson (disambiguation)
Jonathan Watson, Scottish comedian and impressionist